The Zhengdian was a 35-volume Chinese political treatise in historical form which was written approximately in 742 by Liu Zhi, son of esteemed historical critic Liu Zhiji. The book did not survive, but it was further expanded and borrowed by Du You in his Tongdian.

Notes

References 
 Yang, Xumin. Lun Liu Zhi (On Liu Zhi). Huaihai Wenhui. 2002.2. p. 32-36.
 Robert G. Hoyland (1998). Seeing Islam as others saw it : a survey and evaluation of Christian, Jewish, and Zoroastrian writings on early Islam. Princeton, N.J: Darwin Press. .

Tang dynasty literature